Mother's Day is an annual celebration honoring mothers.

Mother's Day may also refer to:

Film and television

Films
 Mother's Day (1980 film), an American slasher film
 Mother's Day (1989 film), an American television crime drama
 Mother's Day (1993 film), an Austrian comedy
 Mother's Day (2010 film), an American remake of the 1980 film
 Mother's Day (2016 film), an American romantic dramedy film

Television episodes
 "Mother's Day" (Courage the Cowardly Dog), 1999
 "Mothers Day" (Drop Dead Diva), 2011
 "Mother's Day" (Futurama), 2000
 "Mother's Day" (General Hospital: Night Shift), 2007
 "Mother's Day" (Kim Possible), 2004
 "Mother's Day" (Law & Order), 2003
 "Mother's Day" (The Middle), 2010
 "Mother's Day" (Modern Family), 2011
 "Mother's Day" (Orange Is the New Black), 2015
 "Mother's Day" (Pose), 2018
 "Mother's Day" (Raising Hope), 2013
 "Mother's Day" (Rugrats), 1997
 "Mother's Day" (Trophy Wife), 2014

Other uses
 Mother's Day, a 2000 play by Jeff Baron
 Mother's Day, a 1950 play by J. B. Priestley
 "Mother's Day", a song by Blink-182 from Take Off Your Pants and Jacket
 "Mother's Day", a song by Nada Surf from The Proximity Effect
 Mother's Day, a fictional town in the 1988 video game Mother

See also
 
 Mothering Sunday, a Christian holiday in Europe on the 4th Sunday in Lent
 Parents' Day
 Father's Day (disambiguation)